Fitzwater is a patronymic surname of English origin, being a variant of Fitz Walter, 'son of Walter'. Notable people with the surname include:

Jack Fitzwater (born 1997), English footballer
Marlin Fitzwater (born 1942), former press secretary for presidents Ronald Reagan and George H. W. Bush
Paul Fitzwater (born 1959), Republican member of the Missouri House of Representatives
Rodger Fitzwater (born 1962), Democrat member of the Missouri House of Representatives
Sidney A. Fitzwater (born 1953), American jurist
Travis Fitzwater (born 1981), Republican member of the Missouri House of Representatives

See also
Fitzwater Wray (1869–1938), British cycling journalist
Fitzwater Station, a restaurant and former stop along the Underground Railroad
Thomas Fitzwater Elementary School, located in the Upper Dublin School District of Pennsylvania